Reece Scarlett (born March 31, 1993) is a Canadian professional ice hockey defenceman who is currently playing for Löwen Frankfurt of the Deutsche Eishockey Liga (DEL). He was originally drafted by the New Jersey Devils, 159th overall, in the 2011 NHL Entry Draft.

Playing career
Scarlett played midget hockey with his hometown club, the Sherwood Park Kings, in the Alberta Midget Hockey League after his talent was noticed to be originally selected 12th overall by the Swift Current Broncos in the 2008 WHL Bantam Draft. Scarlett was later signed by the Broncos and embarked on a major junior career in the Western Hockey League from the tail end of the 2008–09 season.

After his second full season with the Broncos and having participated in the CHL Top Prospects Game, Scarlett was drafted in the sixth round, 159th overall, by the New Jersey Devils in the 2011 NHL Entry Draft.

Aprroaching his final junior season with Swift Current in 2012–13, Scarlett was signed to a three-year, entry-level contract with the New Jersey Devils on September 7, 2012. He matched his previous season totals with the Broncos in collecting 9 goals and 40 assists for 49 points in 67 games.

Scarlett played the duration of his rookie contract within the Devils organization with AHL affiliate, the Albany Devils. As a restricted free agent, he was signed to a one-year contract extension with New Jersey on July 18, 2016. He was assigned to continue his tenure with the Albany Devils to begin the 2016–17 season. Having played over 200 games with Albany, placing fourth in all-time assists, Scarlett faced limited prospects of a recall to the NHL with New Jersey. At the trade deadline on March 1, 2017, Scarlett was traded by the Devils to the Florida Panthers in exchange for Shane Harper. He was to continue in the AHL, assigned to the Springfield Thunderbirds and scored a goal in his debut before suffering a season-ending injury later in the game.

On July 1, 2017, Scarlett agreed to a one-year, two-way contract to remain with the Florida Panthers. After participating in his first training camp with the Panthers, Scarlett was familiarly re-assigned to the AHL on September 25, 2017. With the Thunderbirds struggling at start of the 2017–18 season, and having contribute with 2 points in 13 games, Scarlett was traded by the Panthers to the Dallas Stars in exchange for Ludvig Bystrom on November 10, 2017.

Having played seven seasons in the AHL and unable to break through to the NHL, Scarlett left North America as a free agent to join Latvian club, Dinamo Riga of the KHL, on a one-year contract on August 23, 2020.

Career statistics

Regular season and playoffs

International

Awards and honours

References

External links

1993 births
Living people
Albany Devils players
Canadian ice hockey defencemen
Dinamo Riga players
Löwen Frankfurt players
New Jersey Devils draft picks
Springfield Thunderbirds players
Swift Current Broncos players
Texas Stars players